Chris Pendleton (born January 21, 1982) is a former American amateur wrestler who competed for Oklahoma State University. Pendleton won NCAA Division I wrestling titles at 174 pounds in 2004 and 2005 and was a three-time collegiate All-American.

Biography
He defeated future two-time NCAA champion, Dan Hodge Trophy winner, and MMA world champion Ben Askren of Missouri for both of his titles. Pendleton had beaten Askren in the majority of their meetings and provoked controversy after telling a reporter that there was no "rivalry" between them. Pendleton also won the 145-pound California state championship his senior year at Lemoore High School in Lemoore, California. He is the son of Bill Pendleton of Fresno and Lisa Cervantez of Lemoore. He has two younger brothers who both were wrestlers.

In March 2020, he was named head wrestling coach at Oregon State University.

References

1982 births
Living people
American male sport wrestlers
Oklahoma State Cowboys wrestlers